Bernathonomus ovuliger is a moth of the family Erebidae. It is found in Colombia.

References

Phaegopterina
Moths described in 1922